W.A.I.S.T. is the acronym for the West Africa Invitational Softball Tournament organized each January/February in Dakar by the local U.S. Embassy and Peace Corps Senegal. 

This amateur, co-ed slo-pitch softball tournament mainly attracts North American expatriates, and sometimes Japanese expats as well, although Peace Corps volunteers are by far the bulk of participants. In recent years there has been increased participation by Senegalese nationals.  Participating teams have come from Senegal, The Gambia, Mauritania, Mali, Cape Verde, Niger, Guinea, and Burkina Faso.  Peace Corps volunteers, U.S. embassy personnel, students and faculty from local schools (mostly the International School of Dakar) make up the majority of the teams.

Games are held throughout Dakar including the Dakar campus of Suffolk University and the field of the International School of Dakar.  The majority of teams play in a non-competitive, social league; this includes most of the Peace Corps teams who every year provide entertainment with their themed costumes. Peace Corps volunteers and expatriates interested in participating should contact Peace Corps Senegal the fall before the year they wish to participate to make arrangements. A competitive league also plays with teams represented from Senegal, the U.S., and Japan among others.

In conjunction with the tournament, Peace Corps Senegal use to host an "All Volunteer Conference" and a "WID/GAD Conference" where volunteers throughout West Africa shared their projects and best practices with others in the region.

An offshoot event, W.A.I.S.T.D.C., began in 2008, and is held in mid-summer in Washington, D.C.

External links
 Peace Corps Senegal

Softball competitions
Dakar